is a Japanese professional  basketball player who plays for Fujitsu Red Wave of the Women's Japan Basketball League . She also plays for Japan women's national 3x3 team.

References

1998 births
Living people
Japanese women's basketball players
Sportspeople from Hokkaido